The 1982 United States Senate election in New Mexico took place on November 2, 1982. Incumbent Republican U.S. Senator Harrison Schmitt was running for re-election to a second term, but lost to Democrat Jeff Bingaman.

Democratic primary

Candidates 
 Jeff Bingaman, Attorney General of New Mexico
 Jerry Apodaca, former Governor of New Mexico
 Virginia Keehan

Results

General election

Candidates
Jeff Bingaman, Attorney General of New Mexico (Democratic)
Harrison Schmitt, incumbent U.S. Senator first elected in 1976 and former astronaut (Republican)

Campaign
Bingaman ran advertisements that criticized Schmitt's views on a minimum Social Security and mining on federally protected land. Schmitt countered these ads by criticizing Bingaman's work as attorney general, citing the handling of the 1980 state prison riot and asking the governor to pardon an inmate that was on the FBI's 10 Most Wanted List. Another ad that Bingaman ran asked, "What on Earth has he done for you lately?"

The two negative ads that Schmitt ran were received poorly and later pulled.

Results
The turnout was approximately 70%.

Aftermath 
Schmitt thought the media was biased against him during the campaign.

See also 
 1982 United States Senate elections

References 

New Mexico
1982
1982 New Mexico elections
Harrison Schmitt